The sierran elaenia (Elaenia pallatangae) is a species of bird in the family Tyrannidae.

Distribution and habitat
It is found in Bolivia, Brazil, Colombia, Ecuador, Guyana, Peru, and Venezuela.  Its natural habitats are subtropical or tropical moist montane forests and heavily degraded former forest.

Subspecies
Five subspecies are currently recognized:
 Elaenia pallatangae pallatangae – Sclater, 1862: found in Colombia and Ecuador
 Elaenia pallatangae intensa – Zimmer, 1941: found in Peru
 Elaenia pallatangae exsul – Todd, 1952: found in Bolivia
 Elaenia pallatangae olivina – Salvin & Godman, 1884: found in the tepuis of southeastern Venezuela and Guyana
 Elaenia pallatangae davidwillardi – Dickerman & Phelps Jr, 1987: found in the tepuis of southern Venezuela

Due to the recently discovered genetic divergence of both E. p. olivina and E. p. davidwillardi from the nominate subspecies, some authorities now consider them to be a separate species, the Tepui elaenia.

References

sierran elaenia
Birds of the Northern Andes
sierran elaenia
sierran elaenia
Taxonomy articles created by Polbot